Pinoy Big Brother is a Philippine reality game show based on the Dutch reality game show, Big Brother. The show revolves around a group of housemates (contestants) who volunteer to reside in the Pinoy Big Brother house for a set number of days as they compete against each other to be the Big Winner.

Contestants are selected through live site and online auditions, with individuals of foreign origin being eligible to compete in the show.  Age requirements were implemented in all seasons. For Connect and Kumunity Season 10, which were held amid the COVID-19 pandemic, all auditions were conducted online, with the age requirement being raised to 16 in compliance with quarantine protocols.

While most housemates leave the house via public vote, some had exited the house by their own will in an action known as a "Voluntary Exit". In addition, a housemate can be removed from the game via a "Forced Eviction" as a result of rule violations or medical emergencies. In several occasions, evicted housemates are given a chance to return to the house via public voting or wildcard competitions.

Since its inaugural season in 2005, the show has featured 392 housemates (separately counting two housemates who played as one) in three different editions; 185 regulars, 60 celebrities and 147 teens. Teen Edition Plus saw 14 guardians competing in a separate competition alongside the main teen edition. Otso had Star Dreamers compete for a chance to enter the house as a housemate to replace the weekly evictee wherein a total of 13 star dreamers failed to do so.

A total of 17 winners have been crowned with one season crowning two. Anji Salvacion of Kumunity Season 10 is the most recent winner. 64 housemates became finalists and there have been 245 evictions, 23 voluntary exits and 26 forced evictions.

Housemates

2005 - 2010

2010 - 2019

2020 - present

References

External links
 Pinoy Big Brother official website

Pinoy Big Brother